Cooperative Energy (CE) is an electrical generation and transmission cooperative in Hattiesburg, Mississippi providing power to more than 427,000 homes and businesses.

In 2015, the cooperative decided not to purchase a 15 percent interest in Mississippi Power's  coal gasification power plant in Kemper County, Mississippi known as the Kemper Project.

On November 9, 2016 the South Mississippi Electric Power Association (SMEPA) changed its name to Cooperative Energy.

In 2017 the cooperative opened a solar farm (photovoltaic power station) near Sumrall, Mississippi.

References

External links
Cooperative Energy

Electric generation and transmission cooperatives in the United States
Hattiesburg, Mississippi